Guli is a village in Dhania Union of Bhola Sadar Upazila, Bhola District, Barisal Division, Bangladesh.

References

Populated places in Bhola District
Villages in Bhola District
Villages in Barisal Division